Emma Anne Byrne (born 14 June 1979) is an Irish football goalkeeper who played for the Republic of Ireland women's national football team on a record 134 occasions and served as captain of the team. She spent almost 17 years with Arsenal before joining Brighton & Hove Albion in January 2017.

Club career
Byrne started playing as a schoolgirl for Leixlip United before moving to as a goalkeeper to St Patrick's Athletic in the Dublin Women's Soccer League and then agreed to join professional Danish Elitedivisionen club Fortuna Hjørring after completing her schooling. After spending one year in Denmark, Bryne returned to Ireland because she was homesick and took a job as a secretary with the Health Board.

When Arsenal Ladies' goalkeeper Lesley Higgs was injured, the club's Irish midfielder Ciara Grant alerted Arsenal manager Vic Akers to her friend Bryne's availability. Byrne joined Arsenal in January 2000 and quickly became their first choice goalkeeper. She won a domestic treble in her first full season with Arsenal, saving a penalty in the 2001 FA Women's Cup final win over Fulham, and was voted club Players' Player of the Year in 2003 and 2005.

She became a European champion with Arsenal in April 2007, when they beat Umeå IK in the 2007 UEFA Women's Cup Final 1–0 on aggregate, a tie in which she made numerous vital saves in the home and away games. In 2008 she rejected an offer to join American Women's Professional Soccer franchise Boston Breakers, who failed to match her salary expectations.

Byrne was given a free transfer by Arsenal in December 2016 on the expiry of her contract, after being supplanted in the team by Sari van Veenendaal. She agreed to join FA WSL 2 club Brighton & Hove Albion Women for the FA WSL Spring Series. On 4 August 2017, 38-year-old Byrne announced her retirement from football on Twitter.

In August 2019 it was announced that Byrne had come out of retirement to join Spanish club Terrassa FC.

International career

Byrne made her first appearance for the Republic of Ireland women's national football team on 31 March 1996 against Belgium. She won her 100th cap against Croatia on 26 September 2013. Following the retirement of Ciara Grant, coach Sue Ronan named Byrne the team captain in March 2013. In April 2017 a player revolt led by Byrne secured substantially improved working conditions for Ireland's female national team players.

Personal life

Bryne grew up in Leixlip, County Kildare, and attended secondary school at Coláiste Chiaráin.

She previously worked in the Football Association of Ireland (FAI) ticket office and was later employed as a coach in Arsenal's academy. She married former professional footballer Marcus Bignot in June 2013. Emma and Marcus Bignot have since divorced.

Honours

Club
Arsenal
UEFA Women's Champions League: (1) 2007
FA WSL: (2) 2011, 2012
FA Women's Premier League National Division: (9) 2000–01, 2001–02, 2003–04, 2004–05, 2005–06, 2006–07, 2007–08, 2008–09, 2009–10
FA Women's Cup: (9) 2000–01, 2003–04, 2005–06, 2006–07, 2007–08, 2008–09, 2010–11, 2012–13, 2013–14, 2015–16
FA WSL Cup: (3) 2011, 2012, 2013
FA Women's Premier League Cup: (5) 1999–00, 2000–01, 2004–05, 2006–07, 2007–08

Individual
Arsenal Ladies Player of the Year: 2003 & 2005
Eircom International Player of the Year: 2008
FAI Senior Women's International Player of the Year: 2012
PFA Ireland Merit Award: 2017

References

External links

 Player profile - 1. Emma Byrne Arsenal FC (Archived)
 Women's World Cup - Emma Byrne UEFA
 Emma Byrne profile FIFA

1979 births
Living people
People from Leixlip
Association footballers from County Kildare
Republic of Ireland women's association footballers
Arsenal W.F.C. players
Republic of Ireland women's international footballers
FA Women's National League players
Expatriate women's footballers in Denmark
Expatriate women's footballers in England
Women's Super League players
Fortuna Hjørring players
Dublin Women's Soccer League players
FIFA Century Club
Women's association football goalkeepers
Irish expatriate sportspeople in England
Brighton & Hove Albion W.F.C. players